Club Deportivo San José was a football club from Oruro, Bolivia.
Founded in 1942, they have won the Bolivian league four times: in 1955, 1995, 2007, and 2018. Their colours are white and blue, and they play at the Estadio Jesús Bermúdez (capacity 35,000).

The club was founded on 19 March 1942 as Liga Deportiva San José. It was kept that way, until the club changed their name to the current one.

Uniform 

 Home : White t-shirt with a blue "V", blue shorts and blue socks.
 Away : Navy blue t-shirt with a blue "V" and orange details, navy blue shorts and socks of the same color.
 Third : Crimson red shirt with a blue "V", blue pants and blue socks.

Honours
Bolivian Primera División:
Champions (4): 1955, 1995, 2007-C, 2018-C
Runners-up (2): 1991, 1992

Copa Simón Bolivar:
Champions (1): 2001

Performance in CONMEBOL competitions
Copa Libertadores: 7 appearances
Best: Round of 16 in 1996.
1992: First Round
1993: First Round
1996: Round of 16
2008: First Round
2013: First Round
2015: First Round
2019: First Round

Copa Sudamericana: 4 appearances
Best: Round of 16 in 2010.
2010: Round of 16
2011: First Round
2014: First Round
2018: First Round

Current squad
Updated 15 April 2022.

External links
 Unofficial site
Club San Jose at Soccerway

References

 
Association football clubs established in 1942
San Jose
1942 establishments in Bolivia